Gertrude Araba Esaaba Torkornoo (born 11 September 1962) is a Ghanaian judge and author. Formerly a judge of the Appeal Court, she was nominated Supreme Court Judge in November 2019 and vetted on 10 December 2019. She was sworn in on 17 December 2019. Aside law she has authored books, plays, academic essays, articles and presentations.

Early life and education
Gertrude Torkornoo hails from Winneba in the Central Region of Ghana. She was born on 11 September 1962 in Cape Coast. She had her secondary education at Wesley Girls' High School for her ordinary level certificate and Achimota School for her advanced level certificate. She had her tertiary education at the University of Ghana and completed the Ghana School of Law in 1986.

Career
Prior to joining Fugar & Co., a law firm in Accra as a pupil associate, Torkornoo worked as a volunteer at the FIDA Legal Aid Service and had her internship at Nabarro Nathanson in London. She returned to the firm (Fugar & Co., a law firm) in 1994 to become its director. In January 1997, she became a Managing Partner at Sozo Law Consult until 14 May 2004 when she was appointed a Justice at the High Court of Ghana. She worked as a High Court judge until October 2012 when she was elevated to the Court of Appeal. She had been a justice of the Court of Appeal until her nomination for the role of Supreme Court Judge in November 2019. She was sworn into office on 17 December 2019.

Prior to her appointment as Supreme Court justice, Torkornoo has held a number of leadership positions, some of which include; Supervising Judge of Commercial Courts, Chair of the Editorial Committee of Association of Magistrates and Judges, Chief Editor for the development of Judicial Ethics Training Manual, Vice-chair of the E-Justice Steering/Oversight Committee and vice-chair of the Internship and Clerkship Programme for the Judiciary. She is also a Faculty Member of the Judicial Training Institute and a member of the Governing Board of the Judicial Training Institute.

She is part of a seven-member panel hearing the 2020 election petition by John Mahama against The Electoral Commission of Ghana and Nana Akufo-Addo,

See also
List of judges of the Supreme Court of Ghana
Supreme Court of Ghana

References

External links 

 JustTrudy Website

1962 births
Living people
Justices of the Supreme Court of Ghana
Ghanaian women judges
Ghana School of Law alumni
University of Ghana alumni
People educated at Wesley Girls' Senior High School
Alumni of Achimota School